Awards and decorations of the Texas Military are medals, ribbons, badges, tabs, trophies, plaques, certificates, memorials, and monuments that recognize service and achievement while serving in the Texas Military Forces.

Regulation 
The Texas Military Department medal and ribbon awards are governed by the Texas Government Code (Chapter 437, Subchapter H) and Joint Force Texas Regulation (1-07). Because Texas Military Forces existence is authorized under Title 32 of the United States Code, wear and precedence of medals and ribbons on the service uniform and duty uniform is governed by the United States Department of the Army Pamphlet regulation 670-1.

Because Texas National Guard service members are also subject to Title 10 of the United States Code, they are also authorized to wear and eligible to earn awards, decorations, and badges of the United States National Guard and United States Armed Forces.

Texas State Guard service members who previously earned awards, decorations, and badges of the United States National Guard and United States Armed Forces are authorized to wear them.

Order of precedence 
Because Texas Military Forces existence is authorized under Title 32 of the United States Code, precedence of medals and ribbons on the service uniform and duty uniform is governed by the Department of Defense Instruction 1348.33 and United States Department of the Army Pamphlet regulation 670-1.

Like the United States Armed Forces, Texas Military medals and ribbons are distinctly categorized by general service and achievement awards, and distinguished service and achievement decorations, which is reflected in the order of precedence.

General order of precedence:

 United States Armed Forces personal decorations
 United States Armed Forces unit awards
 United States Non-Military (personal) Decorations, to include certain Military Society Decorations and Medals, as outlined in DOD Instr. 1348.33 section 11 (c)(2019), and as defined by 10USC§ 1123, Right to Wear Badges of Military Societies, but only those to wit: 'a society originally composed of men who served in an armed force of the United States during the Revolutionary War, the War of 1812, the Mexican War, the Civil War, the Spanish–American War, the Philippine–American War, or the Chinese Relief Expedition of 1900' (e.g., Society of the Cincinnati, Military Order of Foreign Wars, Veterans of Foreign Wars, Army and Navy Union, Sons of the American Revolution), as well as US Government Agency personal decorations(e.g., DOD civilian medals, Homeland Security, NASA, etc.) (DODI1348.33Sec11c).
 United States civilian unit awards
 United States Armed Forces campaign and service medals
 United States Armed Forces service and training awards
 United States Merchant Marine awards and non-military service awards
 Foreign military personal decorations
 Foreign military unit awards
 International service awards
 Foreign military service awards
 United States Armed Forces marksmanship awards
 United States organization awards, and badges of military societies not included in/defined by 10USC1123 and/or formed after that statute, predominantly in the 20th century and later (after 1907) (e.g., American Legion).
 United States National Guard personal decorations
 United States National Guard unit awards
 United States National Guard campaign and service medals
 United States National Guard service and training awards
 Texas Military decorations
 Texas Military unit awards
 Texas Military campaign and service awards
 Texas Military service and training awards

Department level awards

Medals and ribbons 
Because Texas National Guard service members are also subject to Title 10 of the United States Code, they are also authorized to wear, and eligible to earn, medals and ribbons of the United States National Guard and United States Armed Forces. Texas State Guard service members who previously earned medals and ribbons of the United States National Guard and United States Armed Forces are authorized to wear them.

The following is a list of medals and ribbons from the Texas Military. They are distinctly categorized by distinguished service and achievement decorations, and general service and achievement awards, which is reflected by the order of precedence. It is generally stated that decorations are conferred and awards are issued.

Badges 
Because Texas National Guard service members are also subject to Title 10 of the United States Code, they are also authorized to wear, and eligible to earn, Military badges of the United States. Texas State Guard service members who previously earned Military badges of the United States are authorized to wear them.

The following is a list of badges from the Texas Military:

Special Skills

Identification

Tabs

Certificates 

The Texas Adjutant General's Certificate of Commendation
Awarded for outstanding achievement or performance of duty when such action or duty is noteworthy. It may be presented to any member of the Texas Military Forces, or to any employee, civilian or military, of the Texas Military Department. It may also be awarded to a unit/detachment of the Texas Military Forces for outstanding administrative or training achievement performance. The certificate will not be awarded for any acts or performance covered by another award, except that awards in conjunction with retirement may cover the entire period(s) of service in the Texas Military Forces or with the Texas Military Department, regardless of any other awards.
The Texas Adjutant General's Certificate of Appreciation
Awarded to any individual, organization, or entity (military or civilian), not a member or part of the Texas National Guard or Texas State Guard, for significant aid, assistance, or support to any part or all of the Texas Military Forces.

Hall of Honor 

The Hall of Honor was established by the Texas Military Department in 1980 to "recognize outstanding service and leadership" of Texas Military Forces service members operating under state or federal command. As of 2018, it has 120 inductees.

It is hosted by the Texas Military Forces Museum at Camp Mabry. It is both an exhibit with a digital kiosk that showcases inductee biographies, and an eponymous conference center that may be rented for conventions or banquets. Inductees also receive a trophy, which has varied in type since 1980.

Hall of Fame 

The Texas Ranger Hall of Fame was established in 1964 to recognize service members who "significantly contributed to the development of the service or died heroically in the line of duty." As of 2019, it has 31 inductees — 24 of which served under the Texas Military Department. The Texas Rangers were a branch of the Texas Military Forces from 1835 to 1935, providing cavalry, special operations, and military police capabilities. Administrative control (ADCON) of the Texas Rangers was transferred from the Texas Military Department to the Texas Department of Public Safety (DPS) in 1935. Under DPS, the Texas Rangers perform duties similar to the Federal Bureau of Investigation (FBI) for Texas as a State Bureau of Investigation (SBI).

Texas State Cemetery 

The Texas State Cemetery was established by the Fifth Texas Legislature in 1854 as the burial site for General Edward Burleson in Austin. It is considered the "Arlington of Texas." It was extensively expanded after the American Civil War for the burial of 2,000 officers and their wives. It has expanded over the ensuing years for the burial of "prominent" Texans. It is operated by the Texas State Preservation Board but remains predominately occupied by Texas military service members.

Other awards 

Texas Meritorious Service Award – presented to civilians, organizations, or non-Texas service members for exceptional service and support to the Texas Military Forces.
President's Volunteer Service Award – Service (volunteered hours) in the Texas Military Forces are eligible for the President's Volunteer Service Award, a Bronze, Silver, Gold, and Lifetime necklet award.

Branch level awards

Gonzales Cup 
The Gonzales Cup is the top award of the Commander's Small Unit Excellence Challenge, an annual, two-day team and individual competition that tests core skills and physical endurance of Texas State Guard service members. It was established in 2013 and its namesake is the Battle of Gonzales.

300 Club 
The 300 Club is an unofficial award colloquially referred to by service members who achieve the maximum score of 300 points in the Army Physical Fitness Test. While it is universally recognized among the Texas Army National Guard, Texas Air National Guard, and Texas State Guard, there is no official list that documents its members. It is generally an esprit de corps tradition at the unit level.

Unit level awards 
Unit level awards that may be worn on a service or duty uniform are authorized as a military tradition in United States Department of the Army Pamphlet regulation 670-1 at the discretion of the commanding officer.

Spur Walk (Discontinued) 
Spur Walk, also known as Operation Heavy METL, is a 24hr, 18-mile team competition that consists of land navigation, leadership reaction tasks, obstacle course, and mission skills. Service members who earn enough points are awarded silver spurs. It was established in 2008 and its namesake is the Order of the Spur, for which the competition mirrors.

Officer Candidate School (TXSG)

Honor Graduate 
The Honor Graduate award, officially the BG Thomas C. Hamilton Distinguished Honor Graduate and formerly the MG Raymond C. Peters Distinguished Honor Graduate, is the top award of the Texas State Guard Officer Candidate School (OCS). It is awarded to graduates of the Officer Candidate Course (OCC) based on their combined Leadership, Academic, Physical Fitness, and Peer Evaluation performance.

The award was established in 2003 by COL Mervyn J. Doherty when he established Officer Candidate School. Its first given namesake was the commanding general of the Texas State Guard, MG Raymond C. Peters, in 2009. It was renamed after BG Thomas C. Hamilton in 2014, who redesigned the school in 2010.

Crucible MVP 
The Crucible MVP award, officially the Final Field Training Exercise Most Valuable Player Award, is the second highest award of the Texas State Guard Officer Candidate School (OCS). It is awarded to candidates of the Officer Candidate Course (OCC) final field training exercise based on their combined Leadership, Academic, and Physical Fitness performance during the exercise.

The award was established in 2014 by CPT H. Lee Burton and its namesake is week 10 of United States Marine Corps Recruit Training, for which the exercise mirrors.

Other awards 

 OCC Leadership Award
 OCC Academic Award
 OCC Physical Training Award
 OCC Crucible Team Award

Command and General Staff College (TXSG)

Honor Graduate 
The Honor Graduate award, officially the COL Stephen B. Springer Academic Excellence Award is the top award of the Texas State Guard Command and General Staff College. It is awarded to graduates based on their academic performance.

The award was established in 2014 by COL Stephen B. Springer when he established the Commander and General Staff College. It was given his namesake in 2015.

Inactive and obsolete awards 

Texas Military Department Awards:
Texas National Guard:
 Texas National Guard Medal of Merit
 Texas National Guard Mexican War Service Medal
 Texas National Guard Outstanding Service Medal
 Texas National Guard Provost Marshal Section Ribbon
 Texas National Guard State Guard Civil Defense Ribbon
Texas State Guard:
Special Operations Tab (for Quick Response Teams, 2009–2014)
Small Arms Marksmanship Ribbon
Marksmanship Qualification Badge
Occupational Badges:
(a) Command and Control (b) Law Enforcement/Security Forces (c) Enlisted Medical (d) Medical Corps (e) Medical Services/Biomedical Sciences (f) Nurse (g) Material Acquisition (h) Chaplain (all denominations) (i) Chaplain Services (j) Communications/Computer Systems (k) Information Management (l) Judge Advocate (m) Logistics (n) Personnel and Manpower Management (o) Operations Support (p) Public Affairs (q) Paralegal (r) Services (s) Supply
Texas State Guard Association awards:
Texas State Guard Association Medal
James Bowie Award
Sam Houston Award
William Travis Award
Juan Seguin Award

See also 

 Texas Military Forces
Texas Military Department
List of conflicts involving the Texas Military
 Awards and decorations of the Texas government
 Awards and decorations of the United States Armed Forces

References 

Texas Military Forces
Texas Military Department